The Jeanneau Arcachonnais is a French trailerable sailboat that was designed as a day sailer and pocket cruiser, first built in 1969.

Production
The design was built by Jeanneau in France, starting in 1969, but it is now out of production.

Design

The Arcachonnais is a recreational keelboat, built predominantly of fiberglass. It has a fractional sloop rig, with a deck-stepped mast and aluminum spars. The hull has a raked stem, an angled transom, a transom-hung rudder controlled by a tiller and a fixed stub keel with a retractable centerboard. It displaces  and carries  of ballast.

The boat is normally fitted with a small outboard motor for docking and maneuvering.

The design has sleeping accommodation for two people, with a double "V"-berth in the bow cabin.

See also

List of sailing boat types

Similar sailboats
Buccaneer 200
Buzzards Bay 14
Com-Pac Sunday Cat
Dolphin 17
Drascombe Lugger
Edel 540
Holder 17
Mercury 18
Mistral T-21
Naiad 18
Sandpiper 565
Sanibel 17
Siren 17
Typhoon 18
Vagabond 17

References

External links

Keelboats
1960s sailboat type designs
Sailing yachts
Trailer sailers
Sailboat types built by Jeanneau